Anisostichus is a genus of beetles in the family Carabidae, containing the following species:

 Anisostichus laevis Curtis, 1839
 Anisostichus octopunctatus Dejean, 1829

References

Harpalinae